Arogya Niketan is a Bengali drama film directed by Bijoy Bose based on the same name novel of Tarasankar Bandyopadhyay. This film was released on 10 August 1967 under the banner of Aurora Film Corporation. This movie received the 15th National Film Award for Best Feature Film in Bengali.

Plot
Pradyut Sen is an allopathic doctor with modern thought come to Nabagram village for medical practice. But there is already an ayurvedic doctor, Jibon Moshai who practises in the village. The movie revolves around the clash between two doctors with their thoughts and moral values.

Cast
 Bikash Roy as Jiban Moshai
 Subhendu Chatterjee as Pradyut
 Ruma Guha Thakurta
 Chhaya Devi
 Sandhya Roy
 Bankim Ghosh
 Rabi Ghosh 
 Dilip Roy 
 Jahar Ganguly
 Sudhanshu Bandyopadhyay	
 Rabin Bhattacharya
 Santi Chatterjee 
 Dhiraj Das

References

1967 films
1967 drama films
Bengali-language Indian films
Indian drama films
Indian black-and-white films
Best Bengali Feature Film National Film Award winners
1960s Bengali-language films
Films based on Indian novels
Films based on works by Tarasankar Bandyopadhyay

External link